Wausau Downtown Airport  is a city-owned public-use airport located in Wausau, a city in Marathon County, Wisconsin, United States. The airport serves general aviation aircraft, charter flights and seaplane operations. It is included in the Federal Aviation Administration (FAA) National Plan of Integrated Airport Systems for 2021–2025, in which it is categorized as a local general aviation facility.

History
The Wausau airport was founded in 1927 and carried commercial flights until 1969 when the Central Wisconsin Airport began operations.

Facilities and aircraft 
The airport contains two asphalt paved runways: 13/31 measuring 5,200 x 100 ft. (1,585 x 30 m) with approved GPS approaches and 5/23 measuring 3,041 x 100 ft. (927 x 30 m). It also has a seaplane landing area designated 12W/30W which measures 8,000 x 300 ft. (2,438 x 91 m). The Wausau NDB navaid, (FZK) frequency 243 kHz, is located on the field.

For the 12-month period ending May 20, 2021, the airport had 36,400 aircraft operations, an average of 100 per day: 93% general aviation, 7% air taxi and less than 1% military. In February 2023, there were 71 aircraft based at this airport: 67 single-engine, 3 jet and 1 helicopter. Both based and transient general aviation aircraft are supported by the fixed-base operator (FBO) Wausau Flying Service.

Cargo airlines

See also
List of airports in Wisconsin

References

External links
Wausau Downtown Airport at FlyWausau.com
  at Wisconsin Airport Directory

Airports in Wisconsin
Wausau, Wisconsin
Buildings and structures in Marathon County, Wisconsin
1927 establishments in Wisconsin